Wheaton World Wide Moving is a moving and storage company based in Indianapolis, Indiana, with more than 250 authorized agents.
It handles household moving, corporate relocation, international shipping, military and government relocation and special commodity shipments.

History

 1945: Clipper Van Lines founded by Earnest S. Wheaton
 1951: Changed name to Wheaton Van Lines, Inc., following lawsuit with Pan Am 
 Late 1950s: Expanded domestic and international services
 1973: First carrier in the nation to hold complete 50-state authority from the Interstate Commerce Commission 
 1986: Named one of the top 101 service companies in America
 1987: Changes name to Wheaton World Wide Moving  
 1989: Named one of the top 101 service companies in America
 2000: Becomes a corporate sponsor of Give Kids the World, a non-profit for children with life-threatening diseases
 2012: Acquires Bekins Van Lines, Inc.

Awards and highlights
Wheaton Moving supports the Give Kids the World program, which helps children with life-threatening illnesses visit attractions in central Florida by providing transportation, meals and attraction tickets.

Wheaton's chairman, Stephen Burns, was named 2006 Ernst & Young Entrepreneur of the Year for the Lake Michigan Area Program.

References

External links
Official Website
Moving Companies Westchester

Moving companies of the United States
Transport companies established in 1945
Storage companies
Companies based in Indianapolis